Duncan Irvine was a Scotland international rugby union player.

Rugby Union career

Amateur career

He played for Edinburgh Academicals; and Aberdeen Rangers. He was staying in Old Machar, Aberdeenshire in 1881 census.

Provincial career

He played for East of Scotland District in February 1876. In this match he was deemed an Edinburgh Academical player.

He played for East of Scotland District against Edinburgh District in January 1887. His brother Bulldog Irvine played for Edinburgh; Duncan was deemed a Aberdeen Rangers player.

He played for the Blues Trial side against Whites Trial in February 1878, again classed as an Edinburgh Accies player.

International career

He was capped three times for Scotland between 1878 and 1879.

Academic career

Irvine joined the British Geological Survey on 1 May 1868. He worked in south-west Scotland:- the Mull of Galloway, Wigtown and Stranraer.

He resigned from the BGS on 10 July 1882.

He moved to Canada, where he continued to be a surveyor; noted as staying at 224 Beacon Hill in Victoria City, British Columbia, in 1898.

Family

His parents were Alexander Robertson Irvine and Sophia Jane Stewart Robertson. He married Sally Green in Victoria, Canada in 1900. He was the older brother of Bulldog Irvine, who was also capped for Scotland, including the first ever rugby international.

He is buried in Ross Bay Cemetery in Victoria, Canada.

References

Sources

 Bath, Richard (ed.) The Scotland Rugby Miscellany (Vision Sports Publishing Ltd, 2007 )

1851 births
1914 deaths
Scottish rugby union players
Scotland international rugby union players
Edinburgh Academicals rugby union players
East of Scotland District players
Rugby union players from Perth and Kinross
Blues Trial players
Rugby union forwards